The 1958 United States elections were held on November 4, 1958, and elected members of the 86th United States Congress. The election took place in the middle of Republican President Dwight D. Eisenhower's second term. Eisenhower's party suffered large losses. They lost 48 seats to the Democratic Party in the House of Representatives, and also lost thirteen seats in the U.S. Senate to the Democrats. This marked the first time that the six-year itch phenomenon occurred during a Republican presidency since Ulysses S. Grant's second term in 1874. Alaska and Hawaii were admitted as states during the 86th Congress.

The ranks of liberal Democrats swelled as the Republican Party suffered several losses in the Northeast and the West. The election contributed to a weakening of the conservative coalition and those opposed to the civil rights movement, allowing for the eventual passage of the Great Society and the Civil Rights Act of 1964. The election saw an influx of northern Democrats who sought to reform the Congressional seniority system, which often gave the best positions to senior southerners who rarely faced difficult re-elections and thus were able to rack up long terms of service.

See also
1958 United States House of Representatives elections
1958 United States Senate elections
1958 United States gubernatorial elections

References

 
1958
United States midterm elections
Elections